Supermodelo was a Spanish reality television and modeling competition which ran from 2006 to 2008, with three seasons being broadcast.

The show employed a team of teachers who helped train aspiring models. The teachers for the first season were stylist (and director of the training center in season 2) Cristina Rodríguez, runway trainer Valerio Pino, trainer Jimmy Roca, and photographer Emmanuel Rouzic. For the second season, dance instructor Rubén Nsue, nutritionist Javier Martínez, acting coach Marta Romero, and etiquette instructor Vanesa Romero joined the show. For the third season, the only returning teacher was Emmanuel Rouzic; Marie-Ange Schmitt-Lebreton became the new director and runway trainer and José "Josie" Fernández became the new stylist. Supermodelo was hosted by Spanish model Judit Mascó for the first two seasons. Eloísa González replaced her for season 3.

Each eliminee was determined on a weekly basis by public voting. The program aimed to find a Spanish representative for the Elite Model Look contest. The first two seasons featured exclusively female casts, while the third featured both male and female contestants. The last season was divided into two separate competitions: male and female, with one male and one female winner being chosen.

Seasons

Viewing figures

References

External links
 

2006 Spanish television series debuts
2008 Spanish television series endings
2000s Spanish television series